The 2018 season of the IFSC Climbing World Cup was the 20th season of the competition. Bouldering competitions were held at seven stops of the IFSC Climbing World Cup. The bouldering season began on April 13 at the World Cup in Meiringen, and concluded on 18 August with the World Cup in Munich. At each stop a qualifying was held on the first day of the competition, and the semi-final and final rounds are conducted on the second day of the competition. The winners were awarded trophies, and the best three finishers received medals. At the end of the season an overall ranking was determined based upon points, which athletes were awarded for finishing in the top 30 of each individual event. Jernej Kruder won the seasonal title in the men's competition and Miho Nonaka won the women's. Japan won the national team competition.

Changes from the previous season 

For the 2018 season the IFSC changed the scoring method for its tournaments. Previously topped boulders were the deciding factor, followed as tiebreakers in decreasing order of importance: attempts to tops, bonus holds (renamed to zones), and attempts to bonus holds. The first and second tiebreakers switched places which means that the results were determined by tops, zones, attempts to tops, and attempts to zones.

Also athletes now need to demonstrate firm control of the two starting hand holds. Previously touching all four marked start points in any manner was deemed sufficient to start an attempt.

Overall ranking 

The overall ranking was determined based upon points, which athletes were awarded for finishing in the top 30 of each individual event.  There were seven competitions in the season, but only the best six attempts were counted. The national ranking was the sum of the points of that country's three best male and female athletes. Results displayed (in brackets) were not counted.

Men 
The results of the ten most successful athletes of the Bouldering World Cup 2018:

Women 
The results of the ten most successful athletes of the Bouldering World Cup 2018:

National Teams 
The results of the ten most successful countries of the Bouldering World Cup 2018:

Country names as used by the IFSC

Meiringen, Switzerland (13–14 April)

Women 
99 athletes attended the World Cup in Meiringen. Miho Nonaka (4T4z 5 5) won the competition in front of Janja Garnbret (4T4z 7 5).

Men 
109 athletes attended the World Cup in Meiringen. Jernej Kruder (3T4z 7 8) won the competition in front of Tomoa Narasaki (2T4z 3 7).

Moscow, Russia (21–22 April)

Women 
100 athletes attended the World Cup in Moscow. Janja Garnbret (4T4z 7 5) won the competition in front of Miho Nonaka (4T4z 7 5), thereby reversing their finish order from Meiringen. As Garnbret and Nonoka achieved identical scores in the final their semi-final scores were used to determine final standings. Akiyo Noguchi, Fanny Gibert, and Shauna Coxsey came in 3rd, 5th, and 6th respectively, thus repeating their exact results from Meiringen. Petra Klingler completed the final in 4th place.

Men 
109 athletes attended the World Cup in Moscow. Tomoa Narasaki (4T4z 12 12) won the competition in front of Jernej Kruder (3T4z 5 6). Thus –as in the women's competition–  the winner and runner-up from Meiringen switched places. Jongwon Chon and Alexey Rubtsov also managed back to back final appearances.

Chongqing, China (5–6 May) 

The Chongqing World Cup was held outdoors and is affected by humidity to a greater extent than the European hosted World Cups. A lightning storm before the semi-finals made conditions difficult for climbers.
The routesetting used a large number of volumes which exhausted Gecko King's inventory.

Women 
47 athletes attended the World Cup in Chongqing. Akiyo Noguchi (4T4z 5 5) won the competition in front of Miho Nonaka (3T3z 7 7). They led from the start as the only two competitors to top the first problem, a burly overhang with a feet first start.
Janja Garnbret and Shauna Coxsey, who had made the finals of both previous World Cups did not attend Chongqing.

Notably Gejo finished in front of Kipriianova for the bronze medal, a result that would have been reversed under the old scoring rules. This was the first time that results under the new system, which weights zones (bonuses) above attempts, differed from that of the old system.

Men 
83 athletes attended the World Cup in Chongqing. Of the four final problem the first one was flashed by all competitors, and the fourth yielded no points for anyone, thus the final standings were effectively decided by the second and fourth boulder only. Kokoro Fujii (3T3z 9 8) won the competition in front of Sean McColl (2T3z 2 4). Jernej Kruder and Alexey Rubtsov had their third straight finals appearances this season.
Jongwon Chon was not competing because of a scheduling clash with the South Korean Asian Games qualifications.

Tai'an, China (12–13 May)

Women 

47 athletes attended the World Cup in Tai'an. Just as in Chongqing Akiyo Noguchi (4T4z 5 5) and Miho Nonaka (4T4z 10 7) dominated the women's final, each finishing two tops ahead of the competition. Noguchi claimed her second straight win while Nonaka continued her streak of finishing at least second in each bouldering competition this season.

Shauna Coxsey, Janja Garnbret and Petra Klingler were not competing.

Men 
93 athletes attended the World Cup in Tai'an. The final was decided on the final problem after all climbers achieved scores on the first three problems. Alex Khazanov (3T4z 7 9) was the only athlete to top the last boulder, and thus won the World Cup in front of Jernej Kruder (2T4z 2 5), the only climber to reach all finals of the season.

Hachioji, Japan (2–3 June)

Women 

68 athletes attended the World Cup in Hachioji. As in the two preceding World Cups Akiyo Noguchi (3T3z 5 5) won in front of Miho Nonaka (3T3z 6 6). After the World Cup Noguchi and Nonaka thus led the competition for the seasonal title by a sufficient margin to leave only them in contention for first and second place.

Men 
91 athletes attended the World Cup in Hachioji. Gabriele Moroni (2T4z 3 6) won his first World Cup in his career of more than ten years. Tomoa Narasaki (1T3z 1 6) came in second. Jernej Kruder missed the finals for the first time in the season.

Vail, United States (8–9 June)

Women 

58 athletes attended the World Cup in Vail. Alex Puccio (3T3z 6 4) won, attending her first World Cup of the 2018 season. The second place went to Miho Nonaka (2T3z 3 4), who continued her streak of finishing at least second in all World Cups of the season. The winner of the three previous World Cups, Akiyo Noguchi (1T3z 2 6), came in third, winning her tenth consecutive medal at Bouldering World Cups.

Men 
91 athletes attended the World Cup in Vail. Rei Sugimoto (3T4z 4 5) won in front of Sean Bailey (2T4z 2 6).

Munich, Germany (17–18 August)

Women 

102 athletes attended the World Cup in Munich. Janja Garnbret (4T4z 4 4) won, solving each problem in her first attempt. The second place went to Miho Nonaka (4T4z 5 5), who thus claimed the overall Bouldering World Cup title. The third place in Munich and the second place overall went to Akiyo Noguchi (4T4z 7 6).

Men 
128 athletes attended the World Cup in Munich. The seasonal overall Bouldering title was decided after the semi-finals when Tomoa Narasaki failed to advance to the finals. Jernej Kruder thus secured the overall title regardless of his eventual finish in the Munich men's final. Gregor Vezonik (2T4z 2 13) won the competition with Kruder (2T3z 9 7) coming second and Jakob Schubert (2T3z 9 11) finishing in third place.

References 

IFSC Climbing World Cup
2018 in sport climbing